Mohamed Khorshed (born 29 October 1950), is an Egyptian skeet shooter who competed at five Summer Olympics from 1984 to 2000. He is the first and only Egyptian to compete at five Olympics, as of 2010. He is also the first African to compete at five Olympics.
He also earned gold at the 1993 African Shooting Championships and bronze at the 1995 edition.

He won the gold medal in skeet at the 1995 All-Africa Games in Harare.

Olympic results

See also
 List of athletes with the most appearances at Olympic Games

References

1950 births
Living people
Skeet shooters
Egyptian male sport shooters
Olympic shooters of Egypt
Shooters at the 1984 Summer Olympics
Shooters at the 1988 Summer Olympics
Shooters at the 1992 Summer Olympics
Shooters at the 1996 Summer Olympics
Shooters at the 2000 Summer Olympics
Competitors at the 1995 All-Africa Games
African Games medalists in shooting
African Games gold medalists for Egypt
20th-century Egyptian people